Stranded may refer to:

Music

Albums and EPs
 Stranded (album), a 1973 album by Roxy Music
 Stranded, a 1990 album by Tangier
 Stranded, a 1992 EP by Konkhra
 (I'm) Stranded, a 1977 album by Australian rock group The Saints
 "(I'm) Stranded" (song), a single from the album

Songs
 "Stranded" (Heart song), 1990
 "Stranded" (Lutricia McNeal song), 1998
 "Stranded" (Plumb song), 1999
 "Stranded" (Van Morrison song), 2005
 "Stranded (Haiti Mon Amour)", a 2010 song by Jay-Z, Bono, Rihanna and the Edge

 "Stranded", a song by Rainbow from the album Bent Out of Shape, 1983
 "Stranded", a song by Royal Hunt from the album Land of Broken Hearts, 1992
 "Stranded", a song by 'No Fun At All' from the album Out of Bounds, 1995
 "Stranded", a song by Alien Ant Farm from the album ANThology, 2001
 "Stranded", a song by Saybia from the album These Are the Days, 2004
 "Stranded", a song by Agnes from the album Agnes, 2005
 "Stranded", a song by Gojira from the album Magma, 2016

 "Stranded", a 2000 song by Blue October
 "Stranded", a 2017 song by Flight Facilities, Broods, Reggie Watts, and Saro

Television 
 Stranded, a five-part survival miniseries by Les Stroud; see Survivorman
 Stranded (1986 film), a 1986 TV movie starring William Hickey
 Stranded (TV series), a 2013 paranormal reality series broadcast on Syfy
 Stranded with Cash Peters, a travel show
 "Stranded" (Jimmy Neutron episode)
 "Stranded" (The Outer Limits), a 1999 episode of The Outer Limits television series
 "The Stranded", the twenty-seventh episode of the sitcom Seinfeld
 The Stranded (TV series), a 2019 Netflix-series about a group of children stranded on an island after a tsunami

Film 
 Stranded (1916 comedy film), a silent film starring Oliver Hardy
 Stranded (1916 drama film), a silent film directed by Lloyd Ingraham
 Stranded (1927 film), a 1927 American film directed by Phil Rosen
 Stranded (1935 film), a drama directed by Frank Borzage and starring Kay Francis
 Stranded (1987 film), a science fiction film starring Ione Skye
 Stranded (2001 film), a science fiction film starring Vincent Gallo and Maria de Medeiros
 Stranded (2002 film), a made-for-television drama based on Swiss Family Robinson
 Stranded (2002 action film), a direct-to-video action film a.k.a. Black Horizon, with Yvette Nipar
 Stranded (2005 film), a 2005 Australian short film
 Stranded (2007 film), a 2007 documentary of 1972 Andes plane crash survivors
 Stranded (2013 film), a science fiction/horror movie directed by Roger Christian and starring Christian Slater

Other uses 
 Stranded (video game), a 2003 video game or its sequel Stranded II
 Stranded: The Secret History of Australian Independent Music 1977–1991, a 1996 book by Clinton Walker

See also
 Strand (disambiguation)